Vũng Liêm is a rural district (huyện) of Vĩnh Long province, in the Mekong Delta region of Vietnam. As of 2003 the district had a population of 176,233. The district covers an area of 294 km². The district capital lies at Vũng Liêm.

References

External links
Map of Vũng Liêm
Pictures of Vũng Liêm
Vũng Liêm Mekong Delta Boat Trip

Districts of Vĩnh Long province